Dirk "Dick" Wayboer (11 May 1936, Jisp) is a sailor from the Netherlands, who represented his country at the 1964 Summer Olympics in Enoshima. Wayboer, as crew (Race 3 - 7) on the Dutch Dragon took the 13th place with helmsman Wim van Duyl, fellow crew member Henny Scholtz and Jan Jongkind (Race 1 - 2).

References

Sources

 
 
 
 

Living people
1936 births
People from Wormerland
Dutch male sailors (sport)
Sailors at the 1964 Summer Olympics – Dragon
Olympic sailors of the Netherlands